Sơn La is a city in the north-west region of Vietnam. It is the capital of Sơn La Province. It is bordered by Thuận Châu District, Mường La District, and Mai Sơn District.

History
In the era of the Sip Song Chau Tai, Sơn La was a fort of the Black Tai.

Demographics
As of 2019 the city had a population of 106,052, covering an area of 323.5 km2.

Administrative divisions
Sơn La City is divided into 12 commune-level sub-divisions, including 7 wards (Chiềng An, Chiềng Cơi, Chiềng Lề, Chiềng Sinh, Quyết Tâm, Quyết Thắng, Tô Hiệu) and 5 rural communes (Chiềng Cọ, Chiềng Đen, Chiềng Ngần, Chiềng Xôm, Hua La).

Climate
Like most of Northern Vietnam, Sơn La has a dry-winter humid subtropical climate (Köppen climate classification: Cwa), affected by the East Asian monsoons.

References

Populated places in Sơn La province
Provincial capitals in Vietnam
Districts of Sơn La province
Cities in Vietnam
Sơn La province